This is a list of American television-related events in 1977.

Events

Programs

Series on air

ABC

CBS

NBC

PBS
 Sesame Street (1969–present)
 The Electric Company (1971–1977)
 Masterpiece Theatre (1971–present)
 Nova (1974–present)
 The Letter People (1977–present)

In syndication

Debuting this year

Resuming this year

Ending this year

Changing networks

Made-for-TV movies

Miniseries

Television stations

Sign-ons

Network affiliation changes

Station closures

Births

Deaths

Television debuts
Richard Dean Anderson – General Hospital
Jack Angel – The All-New Super Friends Hour
Rosanna Arquette – Having Babies II
Christine Baranski – Busting Loose
Carole Bouquet – La famille Cigale
Sofia Coppola – The Godfather Saga
Jane Curtin – The Love Boat
Robert Davi – Contract on Cherry Street
Robert De Niro – The Godfather Saga
Brian Dennehy – Kojak
Robert Englund – The Hardy Boys/Nancy Drew Mysteries:Mystery of the Fallen Angels
William Hurt – Kojak
Nastassja Kinski – Tatort
Jennifer Jason Leigh – Baretta
David Margulies – Kojak
Joe Pantoliano – McNamara's Band
Mandy Patinkin – Charleston
Annie Potts – Black Market Baby
Dennis Quaid – Baretta
Jennifer Savidge – James at 16
John Shea – Eight Is Enough
Meryl Streep – The Deadliest Season
Jeffrey Tambor – Kojak
Christoph Waltz – Am dam des
Ray Winstone – Scum
John Witherspoon – The Richard Pryor Show

See also
 1977 in the United States
 List of American films of 1977

References

External links 
List of 1977 American television series at IMDb

 

es:Anexo:Televisión en 1977
fr:1977 à la télévision
pt:1977 na televisão
sq:1977 në televizion
sv:TV-året 1977